Antoine Demoitié (16 October 1990 – 27 March 2016) was a Belgian cyclist, who rode professionally between 2011 and his death in 2016.

Death

At the age of 25, Demoitié crashed on 27 March 2016 when he went down in a pile-up of several cyclists and was then hit by a motorcycle in the Gent–Wevelgem road race. He died that evening in the hospital.

Major results

2012
 1st Stage 2b Le Triptyque des Monts et Châteaux
 3rd Overall Triptyque Ardennais
1st Stage 3
 3rd Gooikse Pijl
 5th De Vlaamse Pijl
 6th La Côte Picarde
 7th Overall Carpathian Couriers Race
1st Stages 2 & 3
 9th Memorial Van Coningsloo
2013
 2nd Grote Prijs Stad Geel
 3rd Ronde Pévéloise
 4th Ronde van Noord-Holland
 9th Zuid Oost Drenthe Classic I
 10th Polynormande
 10th Druivenkoers Overijse
2014
 1st Tour du Finistère
 2nd Omloop van het Waasland
 4th Handzame Classic
 6th Grand Prix Pino Cerami
 7th Grote Prijs Jef Scherens
 7th Paris–Bourges
2015
 1st Wanzele Koerse
 2nd Grote Prijs Stad Zottegem
 2nd Handzame Classic
 3rd Grand Prix d'Ouverture La Marseillaise
 4th Cholet-Pays de Loire
 7th Halle–Ingooigem
 7th Grand Prix Pino Cerami
 9th Omloop van het Waasland
 10th Overall Circuit des Ardennes
1st Stage 4
2016
 2nd Dorpenomloop Rucphen

See also
 List of professional cyclists who died during a race

References

External links

 
 

1990 births
2016 deaths
Sportspeople from Liège
Cyclists from Liège Province
Belgian male cyclists
Cyclists who died while racing
Sport deaths in France